Robert Lester may refer to:

 Robert Lester (American football) (born 1988), American football safety
 Robert Lester (politician) (1751–1830), businessman and political figure in Lower Canada
 Robert "Squirrel" Lester (1942–2010), tenor in The Chi-Lites